Categories for the Description of Works of Art (CDWA) describes the content of art databases by articulating a conceptual framework for describing and accessing information about works of art, architecture, other material culture, groups and collections of works, and related images. The CDWA includes 532 categories and subcategories. A small subset of categories are considered core in that they represent the minimum information necessary to identify and describe a work. The CDWA includes discussions, basic guidelines for cataloging, and examples.

Purpose
The Categories provide a framework to which existing art information systems can be mapped and upon which new systems can be developed. In addition, the discussions in the CDWA identify vocabulary resources and descriptive practices that will make information residing in diverse systems both more compatible and more accessible. 

The use of the CDWA framework will contribute to the integrity and longevity of data and will facilitate its inevitable migration to new systems as informational technology continues to evolve. Above all, it will help to give end-users consistent, reliable access to information, regardless of the system in which it resides. 

These guidelines hopefully provide a common ground for reaching agreement on what information should be included in art information systems, and what information will be shared or exchanged with other institutions or systems. Target users are curators, registrars, researchers, information managers, and systems vendors.

History
The CDWA is a product of the Art Information Task Force (AITF), which encouraged dialog between art historians, art information professionals, and information providers so that together they could develop guidelines for describing works of art, architecture, groups of objects, and visual and textual surrogates. 

Formed in the early 1990s, the task force was made up of representatives from the communities that provide and use art information: art historians, museum curators and registrars, visual resource professionals, art librarians, information managers, and technical specialists. The work of the AITF was funded by the J. Paul Getty Trust, with a two-year matching grant from the National Endowment for the Humanities (NEH) to the College Art Association (CAA).

CDWA Lite 
ARTstor, the J. Paul Getty Trust, and RLG Programs/OCLC have worked together to develop an XML schema to describe cultural materials and their surrogates to provide an easier and more sustainable model for contributing to union resources. This initiative was driven by the absence of a data content standard specifically designed for unique cultural works, and a technical format for expressing this data in a machine-readable format.

CDWA Lite is an XML schema to describe core records for works of art and material culture based on CDWA and the Cataloging Cultural Objects (CCO) content standard. CDWA Lite records are intended for contribution to union catalogs and other repositories using the Open Archives Initiative (OAI) harvesting protocol. The CDWA Lite schema has been enlarged and integrated into the Lightweight Information Describing Objects (LIDO) schema, which is available on the CIDOC site.

See also
 Cataloging Cultural Objects
 Getty Vocabulary Program
 Visual Resources Association
 Metadata standards

Footnotes

External links
CDWA home page
CDWA Lite and Museumdat: New Developments in Metadata Standards 2008 Annual Conference of CIDOC; Regine Stein and Erin Coburn.
Metadata Textbook Website Index Marcia L. Zeng and Jian Qin, 2008.
Choosing a Metadata Standard for your Digital Project Indiana University Digital Library Program; Metadata Librarian Jenn Riley; 2007 handout.
Museum Computer Network Standards Resources Museum Computer Network
Training materials for Vocabularies and Standards Maintained by the Getty Vocabulary Program
Conference.Archimuse
Data Harvesting and Interchange Working Group (CIDOC)

Art history
Metadata standards
XML-based standards
Museum informatics
Works about the arts